Kate Gale (born 1963) is an American author, poet, librettist, and independent publisher. She is the managing editor of Red Hen Press.

Life 
Kate Gale was born in Binghamton, New York to Stephen Gale and Evadene Swanson.  She graduated with a B.A. in English from Arizona State University.  She received an M.A. in English with a creative writing emphasis from California State University Northridge in 1990 and a Ph.D. in English from Claremont Graduate University in 2003.

Career 

Gale, along with her husband Mark E. Cull, founded Red Hen Press in 1994. Gale is the managing editor of Red Hen Press; the editor of the Los Angeles Review, which is also part of Red Hen Press; and the past president of the Los Angeles chapter of the American Composers Forum.  She was the 2005-2006 president of PEN USA and serves on the board of the School of Arts and Humanities of Claremont Graduate University and Poetry Society of America. She teaches in the Low Residency MFA program at the University of Omaha  and at the MFA in Creative Writing Program at San Diego State University. Gale is an author for HuffPost.

Works 

Gale's work began with Blue Air, a book of poetry published by Garden Street Press, San Luis Obispo.  She published three collections of poetry with Red Hen Press: Where Crows and Men Collide, Selling the Hammock, and Fishers of Men.  Mating Season was published by Tupelo Press in 2004.  She has also written the librettos to two operas.  Rio de Sangre, with composer Don Davis, was showcased at Walt Disney Concert Hall in 2005, by the New York City Opera VOX in May 2007 and had its world premiere on October 22, 2010 with the Florentine Opera Company in Milwaukee.  Paradises Lost, co-written with Ursula K. Le Guin with composer Stephen Taylor, was showcased at the New York City Opera VOX in 2006. In 2014, Kate published two poetry collections: Goldilocks Zone, by the University of New Mexico Press, and Echo Light, by Red Mountain Press—winner of the Red Mountain Press Editor's Award. 2016 saw the appearance of The Palm Trees Are Restless: Five Poems of Kate Gale, a song cycle by composer Mark Abel released on the Delos label. The piece is a setting of texts from Echo Light sung by soprano Hila Plitmann.

Awards 

 Allen Ginsberg Poetry Award
 Claremont Graduate University Fellowship
 Mitchell Lathrop Fellowship
 Red Mountain Press Editor's Award

Bibliography 
The Loneliest Girl (University of New Mexico Press, 2022) 
Echo Light (Red Mountain Press, 2014) 
Goldilocks Zone (University of New Mexico Press, 2014) 
The Crucifix is Down (Red Hen Press, 2005) (ed.)
Mating Season (Tupelo Press, 2004)
Fake-City Syndrome (Red Hen Press, 2002) (ed.)
Lake of Fire (Winter Street Press, 2000)
Blue Cathedral (Red Hen Press, 2000) (ed.)
Fishers of Men (Red Hen Press, 2000)
African Sleeping Beauty (Blue Beginnings Publishing, 2000)
Selling the Hammock (Red Hen Press, 1998)
Anyone is Possible (Red Hen Press, 1997) (ed.)
Where Crows and Men Collide (Red Hen Press, 1995)
Water Moccasins (Title Wave Press, 1994)
Blue Air (Garden Street Press, 1993)

Librettos 
Rio de Sangre with composer Don Davis
Paradises Lost with Ursula K. Le Guin and composer Stephen Andrew Taylor
Inner Circle adapted from the novel by T. C. Boyle with composer Daniel Felsenfeld
Che Guevara with composer Andrew Bayola
The Web Opera with composer Michael Roth
Gargoyles with composer Julia Adolphe

References

External links 
 Red Hen's Website
 Rio de Sangre site
 American Composer's Forum site
 University of Nebraska News site

20th-century American poets
American opera librettists
Women opera librettists
American publishers (people)
American political writers
1965 births
Living people
Writers from Binghamton, New York
Arizona State University alumni
California State University, Northridge alumni
Claremont Graduate University alumni
American librettists
Poets from New York (state)
American women poets
Women librettists
20th-century American women writers
21st-century American women writers
American women non-fiction writers
20th-century American non-fiction writers
21st-century American non-fiction writers
21st-century American poets